BRF2 may refer to:
BRF2 (gene)
 BRF2 radio channel of Belgischer Rundfunk